Zaborowo  is a village in the administrative district of Gmina Kalinowo, within Ełk County, Warmian-Masurian Voivodeship, in northern Poland.

Notable residents
 Siegfried Wischnewski (1922–1989), actor

References

Villages in Ełk County